Apistoloricaria listrorhinos is a species of armored catfish endemic to Colombia where it is found in the Metica River basin.  This species grows to a length of  SL.

References
 

Loricariini
Endemic fauna of Colombia
Freshwater fish of Colombia
Taxa named by Isaäc J. H. Isbrücker
Taxa named by Han Nijssen
Fish described in 1988